Deborah Ann Morgan  is an American film and television actress. She played the role of Angie Baxter–Hubbard on the ABC soap opera All My Children for which she was the first African-American to win the Daytime Emmy Award for Outstanding Supporting Actress in a Drama Series in 1989. She is also known for her role as the Seer in the fourth and fifth seasons of Charmed. In film, she received critical acclaim for her performance as Mozelle Batiste-Delacroix in Eve's Bayou (1997) for which she won the Independent Spirit Award for Best Supporting Female. From 2014 to 2021, she played a recurring role as Estelle Green in the starz crime drama series Power and its spinoff Power Book II: Ghost, and, from 2021 to 2022, co-starred in the Fox drama series Our Kind of People.

Early life
Morgan was born in Dunn, North Carolina, the daughter of Lora, a teacher, and George Morgan Jr., a butcher. She has a younger sister, Terry. The family relocated to the Bronx when Morgan was still a child. In a 1997 interview with People, Morgan revealed that her father was an abusive alcoholic. While he never physically harmed his daughters, Morgan recalled her mother running from her father often. Her father died of leukemia in 1975. Morgan graduated from Aquinas High School.

Career
Morgan's earliest film role was in the movie Monkey Hustle in 1976. She played the role of Vi. Morgan's earliest recurring role was on What's Happening!! from 1976 to 1977 as Diane Harris, and also appeared on Good Times.  In 1979, she received critical acclaim for her portrayal of Alex Haley's great-aunt Elizabeth Harvey on the 1979 miniseries Roots: The Next Generations, and her guest-starring role as Curtis Jackson's ex-girlfriend turned prostitute on The White Shadow. Her most famous role was Angie Baxter Hubbard on the soap opera All My Children, a role she originally played from January 1982 to July 1990. Her portrayal of Angie struck a chord with many Black viewers across America. Angie and her love interest, Jesse Hubbard (Darnell Williams), became the first African-American "supercouple" on the daytime serials.  In 1989, Morgan won the Daytime Emmy Award for Outstanding Supporting Actress in a Drama Series (which she shares with Santa Barbara actress Nancy Lee Grahn).  She and Williams also co-hosted a music video show titled New York Hot Tracks in the mid-1980s.

After leaving All My Children, Morgan played the role of Chantal Marshall on the NBC soap opera, Generations (replacing actress Sharon Brown) and remained with the show until it ended. She then reprised her role as Angie Hubbard on ABC's Loving in 1993. In 1995, she brought the same character to The City (a retooled version of Loving), making Morgan one of the few performers to portray the same character on three different soap operas.  From 1997 to 1998, she also  played Dr. Ellen Burgess on Port Charles. In the 1980s and 1990s, Morgan became a de facto symbol for the possibilities for black women as all of her soap opera roles involved her playing a successful doctor.

Morgan garnered much acclaim from movie critics for her portrayal of clairvoyant Mozelle Batiste Delacroix in director Kasi Lemmons' drama film Eve's Bayou (1997). For her portrayal, she won a Chicago Film Critics Association Award and an Independent Spirit Award and was nominated for an Image Award. She later left soap operas and began her film career with roles in She's All That (1999), The Hurricane (1999), Love & Basketball (2000), Woman Thou Art Loosed (2004), Coach Carter (2005), Relative Strangers (2006), and Color of the Cross (2006). On television, she had roles in The Practice, Strong Medicine, Boston Public, Providence, and Soul Food.

From 2002 to 2003, Morgan played lead character Lora Gibson, opposite Lea Thompson, on the Lifetime drama series For the People. She also played the role of the Seer in the fourth and fifth seasons of Charmed. Morgan returned to All My Children in January 2008; 10 years after leaving daytime television.  In May 2009 and 2011, she was nominated for the Daytime Emmy Award for Outstanding Lead Actress in a Drama Series. In 2011, ABC cancelled All My Children, and Morgan joined the cast of The Young and the Restless as Yolanda "Harmony" Hamilton on October 7, 2011, exactly two weeks after All My Children aired its final television episode on September 23, 2011. In 2013, Morgan starred in the internet version of All My Children, reprising her role of Angie Hubbard. The series premiered on April 29, 2013, and was cancelled after a single season. In November 2013, after All My Children was cancelled, Morgan was cast in Starz drama series, Power, opposite Omari Hardwick and Naturi Naughton. In 2015, she co-starred alongside Richard Lawson and Vivica A. Fox in two TV One holiday movies: Royal Family Thanksgiving and Royal Family Christmas. Morgan later played Toni Braxton's mother in the Lifetime biopic Toni Braxton: Unbreak My Heart.

In 2017, Morgan appeared in the Marvel miniseries The Defenders playing Delores. The following year, she had a recurring role in the BET drama series The Quad. In 2019, she appeared in the Netflix film Sextuplets starring Marlon Wayans. She starred with Kelly Rowland in  the Lifetime movie Merry Liddle Christmas and its sequels. In 2021, she was cast in the Lee Daniels prime time soap opera, Our Kind of People opposite Yaya DaCosta.

Personal life
Morgan has been married four times and has no children. Her first marriage was to Charles Weldon from 1980 until 1984. In 1989, Morgan married actor Charles S. Dutton,  divorcing in 1994. From 1997 until 2000, Morgan was married to photographer Donn Thompson. Morgan has been married to Jeffrey Winston since June 2009.

Filmography

Film

Television

Music video appearances
 Cameo – "Attack Me with Your Love" (1985), "Single Life" (1985)

Notes

References

External links

1950s births
Living people
Actresses from New York City
African-American actresses
American film actresses
American soap opera actresses
American television actresses
Daytime Emmy Award for Outstanding Supporting Actress in a Drama Series winners
Independent Spirit Award for Best Supporting Female winners
Participants in American reality television series
People from Dunn, North Carolina
21st-century African-American people
21st-century African-American women
20th-century African-American people
20th-century African-American women